Filmworks III: 1990–1995 features the scores for film and advertisements by John Zorn. The album was originally released on the Japanese labels Evva in 1995 and Toys Factory in 1996 and subsequently re-released on Zorn's own label, Tzadik Records, in 1997. It features the music that Zorn wrote and recorded for Thieves Quartet (1993), directed by Joe Chappelle, which was performed by the group that would become Masada; nine cues for Kiriko Kubo's Music For Tsunta (1988); eleven tracks for Hollywood Hotel (1994), directed by Mei-Juin Chen; and thirty-two pieces for advertisements by Wieden & Kennedy.

Reception
The Allmusic review by Joslyn Layne awarded the album 4 stars noting that "The third volume cataloguing John Zorn's film scores is a quality release that offers the scores from two films, a rare piece of music cues that would lead to Cynical Hysterie Hour, and music spots for commercials... The musicianship and stylistic range found here is commendable".

Track listing
Thieves Quartet (1993), directed by Joe Chappelle
01/ "Main Title"                               -                   1:00
02/ "The Caper"                                -                   0:57
03/ "Cadence"                                  -                   0:15
04/ "Kidnapping"                               -                   2:15
05/ "Doubt"                                    -                   0:19
06/ "Nocturne 1"                               -                   0:26
07/ "Nocturne 2"                               -                   0:55
08/ "Bag Man"                                  -                   2:00
09/ "The Cop"                                  -                   0:27
10/ "Nocturne 3"                              -                   0:55
11/ "Juke Box"                                -                   2:45
12/ "End Titles"                              -                   4:28

Recorded in New York City in July 1993
John Zorn - alto saxophone, piano on (12)
Dave Douglas - trumpet
Greg Cohen - bass
Joey Baron - drums
Robert Quine (11) - guitar

Music for Tsunta (1988), directed by Kiriko Kubo
13/ Music For Tsunta (nine cues)            -                   3:31
Recorded in New York City in February 1988
Bill Frisell - guitar, banjo
Peter Scherer - keyboards
Carol Emanuel - harp
Christian Marclay - turntables
David Hofstra - bass, tuba
Cyro Baptista - percussion, voice
Bobby Previte - drums, percussion

Hollywood Hotel (1994), directed by Mei-Juin Chen
14/ "Main Titles"                             -                   1:36
15/ "Washing Machine a"                       -                   0:26
16/ "Washing Machine b"                       -                   0:39
17/ "Night Hotel"                             -                   1:17
18/ "Japanese Tourists"                       -                   1:54
19/ "Night Hotel 2"                           -                   1:18
20/ "Objects"                                 -                   3:16
21/ "Night Hotel 3"                           -                   1:00
22/ "Rooftop Death Rattle"                    -                   0:59
23/ "Taiwan"                                  -                   3:48
24/ "End Titles"                              -                   1:50
Recorded in New York City on April 21, 1994
John Zorn - alto saxophone
Marc Ribot - guitars

Music for Weiden and Kennedy (1990–1995)
25/ "Holland"                                 -                   0:16
26/ "Canada"                                  -                   0:31
27/ "France"                                  -                   0:16
28/ "Germany"                                 -                   0:33
29/ "Sweden"                                  -                   0:30
30/ "USA"                                     -                   0:28
31/ "Canada 2"                                -                   0:15
32/ "Sweden 2"                                -                   0:15
33/ "Italy"                                   -                   0:14
34/ "Great Lobby"                             -                   0:33
35/ "Wheelchair Races"                        -                   0:42
36/ "Logo"                                    -                   0:14
37/ "Secret Code"                             -                   0:34
38/ "Secret Code 2"                           -                   1:04
39/ "Don't Break"                             -                   0:40
40/ "Don't Break 2"                           -                   1:09
41/ "Footnotes"                               -                   0:35
42/ "Footnotes 2"                             -                   1:10
43/ "Retraction"                              -                   0:41
44/ "Retraction 2"                            -                   1:15
45/ "Protest"                                 -                   0:39
46/ "Protest 2"                               -                   1:13
47/ "Launch"                                  -                   0:42
48/ "Launch 2"                                -                   1:14
49/ "Elevator"                                -                   0:40
50/ "Elevator 2"                              -                   1:09
51/ "Fiance"                                  -                   0:39
52/ "Fiance 2"                                -                   1:13
53/ "Around the World"                        -                   1:06
54/ "Batman"                                  -                   0:32
55/ "Abstract Woman"                          -                   0:35
56/ "Mystic Woman"                            -                   0:39 
(25-33) recorded in New York City in November 1990
(34) recorded in New York City in March 1992
(35,36) recorded in New York City on August 25, 1993
(37-52) recorded in New York City on May 13, 1994
(53) recorded in New York City on November 3, 1994
(54-56) recorded in New York City on January 24, 1990
Carol Emanuel - harp
Marc Ribot - banjo, guitar
Cyro Baptista - percussion;
Kermit Driscoll - bass
Peter Scherer - keyboards
David Shea - samples
Arto Lindsay - guitar, voice
Bill Laswell - bass
Ikue Mori - drum machines
Keith Underwood - flute
Jill Jaffee - viola
Miguel Frasconi - glass harmonica
Robert Quine - guitar
Guy Klucevsek - accordion
Anthony Coleman - organ, keyboards
Greg Cohen - bass
Joey Baron - drums
Chris Wood - bass
Sim Cain - drums
Eric Friedlander - cello
John Zorn - alto saxophone

All Music by John Zorn
Produced by John Zorn

References

Tzadik Records soundtracks
Albums produced by John Zorn
John Zorn soundtracks
1996 soundtrack albums
Film scores
Soundtrack compilation albums
Tzadik Records compilation albums